Antwerp Port Epic is a cycling race held annually in Belgium. It was created in 2018 and is part of UCI Europe Tour in category 1.1.

Winners

References

Cycle races in Belgium
UCI Europe Tour races
Recurring sporting events established in 2018
2018 establishments in Belgium
Sport in Antwerp Province
Sport in East Flanders